Dama bianca (Italian for "white lady" or "lady in white") may refer to:

 A white rock projecting into the sea at the Italian town of Duino and resembling the form of a veiled woman 
 La Dama Bianca, the Italian name of the 1938 Italian comedy film The Lady in White
 The nickname the media gave to Giulia Occhini, lover of champion Italian cyclist Fausto Coppi
 A brand name given to Italian bicycle manufacturer Bianchi's range of women's-specific bicycles, named for Occhini
 A nickname for certain models of the Maserati 3500 GT

See also
 The Woman in White (disambiguation)